Passion, the Passion or the Passions may refer to:

Emotion
 Passion (emotion), a very strong feeling about a person or thing
 Passions (philosophy), emotional states as used in philosophical discussions
 Stoic passions, various forms of emotional suffering in Stoicism

Suffering of Jesus
 Passion of Jesus, the suffering of Jesus leading up to and during the crucifixion
 Passion (music), musical setting of the texts describing these events
 Passion Play, dramatic representation of these events
 Passion Sunday, the second Sunday before Easter
 Passion Conferences, Christian organization

People
 Pasion, ancient Greek slave and banker
 Passion Richardson (born 1975), American former sprint athlete

Books
 "The Passion" (Milton), 17th-century poem by John Milton
 The Passions an 18th-century poem by William Collins
 Passion, (in Italian, Fosca), 1869 novel by Iginio Ugo Tarchetti
 Passion Play (play) or Passion, 1981 play by Peter Nichols
 Passion: An Essay on Personality, 1984 book by Roberto Unger
 The Passion (novel), 1987 novel by Jeanette Winterson
 Passion (manga), 2004 Japanese yaoi manga series
 Passion (novel), 2011 young adult fantasy novel by Lauren Kate

Film and TV

Film
 Passion (1919 film), alternative title for Ernst Lubitsch's silent film Madame DuBarry
 Passion (1925 film), directed by Richard Eichberg
 Passion (1932 film), directed by Hiroshi Shimizu
 Passion (1940 film), a German drama film
 Passion (1951 film), a French drama film directed by Georges Lampin
 Passion (1954 film), American film directed by Allan Dwan
En passion or The Passion of Anna, 1969, written and directed by Ingmar Bergman
 Passion (1982 film), directed by Jean-Luc Godard
 Passions (1984 film), starring Lindsay Wagner
 Passions (1994 film), directed by Kira Muratova
 Passion (1998 film), directed by György Fehér
 Passion (1999 film), about pianist and composer Percy Grainger
 The Passion of the Christ, 2004 film directed by Mel Gibson
 Passion (2005 film), by director Mohammad Malas

 Passion (2012 film), a film by Brian De Palma

Television
 "Passion" (Buffy the Vampire Slayer), 1998 episode of the fantasy-horror series
 The Passion (TV series), 1999 British TV drama series about an amateur production of a passion play
 Passions, 1999–2008 American soap opera
 Pasión (TV series), 2007–2008, period Mexican telenovela
 The Passion (TV serial), 2008 British serial about the last days of Christ
 "Passion" (Law & Order: Criminal Intent), 2009 episode of the American police procedural
 The Passion (franchise), a huge passion play, held around Easter on the streets of a particular city, initially Netherlands
 The Passion (Netherlands), a Dutch adaptation that has aired yearly since 2011
 The Passion: New Orleans, an American 2016 TV special adaptation held in New Orleans

Music
 Passion 107.9, radio station in Oxfordshire, England
 Passion Radio, radio station in Sussex, England

Classical compositions
 Passions (Bach), five settings of the Passion by Johann Sebastian Bach
 St John Passion, a 1724 setting of the Passion by J. S. Bach
 St Matthew Passion, 1727 setting of the Passion by Johann Sebastian Bach
 Passions (C. P. E. Bach), 21 settings of the Passion by C.P.E. Bach
 The Passion (Haydn) or Symphony No. 49, by Joseph Haydn
 The Passions, by William Hayes
 Passion (musical), 1994 musical by Stephen Sondheim and James Lapine
 Passions (Telemann), series of compositions by Georg Philipp Telemann

Bands and performers
 Passion (band), short-lived disco and post-disco music band
 Passion (worship band), related to Passion Conferences 
 Passion (rapper), former rapper from Oakland, California
 The Passions (American band), 1960s
 The Passions (British band), 1978–1983

Albums
 Passion (Robin Trower album), 1986
 Passion (Jennifer Rush album), 1988
 Passion (Peter Gabriel album), 1989
 Passion – Sources, by Peter Gabriel, 1989
 Passion (Steve Laury album), 1991
 Passion (Regina Belle album), 1993
 Pasiones, by Ednita Nazario, 1994
 Passion (Lady Saw album), 1997
 Passion (Murray Head album), 2002
 Passion (J. C. Schütz album), 2004
 Passion (Lee Jung-hyun album), 2004
 Passion (Geri Halliwell album), 2005
 Pasión (Fernando Lima album), 2008
 Passion (Kreesha Turner album), 2008
 Passion (In-Grid album), 2010
 Passion (Anaal Nathrakh album), 2011
 Passion (Pendragon album), 2011
 Pasión (Roberto Alagna album), 2011
 Passione (Andrea Bocelli album), 2013

Songs
 "Passion" (Gat Decor song), 1992
 "Passion" (Rod Stewart song), 1980
 "Passion" (The Flirts song), 1982
 "Passion" (Hikaru Utada song), 2005
 "P.A.S.S.I.O.N.", by Rythm Syndicate, 1991
 "Pasión" (song), by Sarah Brightman and Fernando Lima, 2008
 "La Passion", by Gigi D'Agostino, 1999
 "Passion", by Amen! UK, 1995
 "Passion", by Andrea and Otilia featuring Shaggy, 2015
 "Passion", by 1 Giant Leap from 1 Giant Leap, 2002
 "The Passion", by Jaden Smith from Syre, 2017
 "The Passions", by Owen Pallett from In Conflict, 2014
 "Passion", by All That Remains from This Darkened Heart, 2004

See also
 Passion Conferences
 Passion fruit
 The Nexus One, an Android smartphone developed by HTC and Google, codename passion
 Pasyon, 1852 Filipino narrative of the passion of Christ
 Passione (disambiguation)